Prata is a Brazilian municipality located in the west of the state of Minas Gerais. Its population as of 2020 was 28,017, living in a total area of 4,856 km². The city belongs to the statistical mesoregion of Triângulo Mineiro and Alto Paranaíba and to the statistical microregion of Uberlândia. It became a municipality in 1873.

Location
Prata is located at an elevation of 631 meters in the rich region known as the Triângulo Mineiro.  It is southwest of Uberlândia and northwest of Uberaba and is connected to Uberlândia by federal highway BR-497.

The distance to Uberlândia is 74 km; and the distance to Belo Horizonte is 640 km.   Neighboring  municipalities are:   Monte Alegre de Minas(N); Ituiutaba, Campina Verde (W) ; Comendador Gomes, Campo Florido (S); Uberlândia and Veríssimo (E).

Economy
The main economic activities are services, agriculture, and small industries.  The GDP in 2005 was R$261 million, with 112 million from services, 29 million from industry, and 102 million from agriculture.  There were 1,487 rural producers on 327,000 hectares of land.  607 farms had tractors.  The main crops were peanuts, rice, sugarcane, beans, corn, and soybeans (15,000 hectares).  There were 344,000 head of cattle (2006).

Health and education
The social indicators rank it in the top tier of municipalities in the state.
Municipal Human Development Index: 0.769 (2000)
State ranking: 177 out of 853 municipalities as of 2000
National ranking: 1368 out of 5,138 municipalities as of 2000 
Literacy rate: 87%
Life expectancy: 70 (average of males and females)

The highest ranking municipality in Minas Gerais in 2000 was Poços de Caldas with 0.841, while the lowest was Setubinha with 0.568.  Nationally the highest was São Caetano do Sul in São Paulo with 0.919, while the lowest was Setubinha.  In more recent statistics (considering 5,507 municipalities) Manari in the state of Pernambuco has the lowest rating in the country—0,467—putting it in last place.

There was one hospital with 41 beds in 2005.  Patients with more serious health conditions are taken care of in Uberlândia or Uberaba.

Paleontology

At Prata there were found rock paintings and fossils of the biggest dinosaur found in Brazil which lived 80 million years ago in the region of Serra da Boa Vista, 40 km from the municipal seat.
The dinosaur was called Maxakalisaurus topai and, after popular vote, it is now known as DINOPRATA.
The model of the 13 meter long titanossauro (made in resin) has been on display in the Museu Nacional do Rio de Janeiro since August, 2006.

See also
 List of municipalities in Minas Gerais

References

External links

 Prefeitura de Prata

Municipalities in Minas Gerais